George McCachnie (–?) was a Scottish professional golfer who played during the late 19th century. His only top-10 finish in The Open Championship came at the 1874 Open Championship where he was tied for tenth place with Jack Ferguson and James Morris.

Early life
McCachnie was born in Scotland circa 1851.

Golf career

1874 Open Championship
McCachnie's only top-10 finish came in the 1874 Open Championship where he carded rounds of 40-39-43-47=169 and tied for tenth place with Jack Ferguson and James Morris.

Death
The date of McCachnie's death is unknown.

Results in major championships

Note: McCachnie played only in The Open Championship.

"T" indicates a tie for a place
Yellow background for top-10

References

Scottish male golfers
1851 births
Year of death unknown